Patricia A. Ritchie (born February 22, 1962) was a Republican member of the New York State Senate who represented the 48th district from 2011-2022. Her district encompassed portions of the North Country abutting Lake Ontario.

Early life
Ritchie is a lifelong resident of Upstate New York. The daughter of Rita A. and Kenneth H. Hilborne, she was born and raised in DePeyster, New York. At 15, she moved with her parents and brother to town of Oswegatchie, New York. She graduated from Heuvelton Central High School in 1980.

She received an associates degree in social work from Mater Dei College of Ogdensburg, New York in 1985. She briefly attended SUNY Plattsburgh, then transferred to SUNY Potsdam. She was married in 1982 and continued her education part-time while raising her family and working. Ritchie earned her bachelor's degree in psychology in 1991.

Career
Ritchie worked for the Department of Motor Vehicles from 1986 to 1999. She was then elected as the St. Lawrence County Clerk, a position she held from 2000 through 2010. In 2002, she was the unsuccessful Republican candidate for New York State Assembly District 116, losing to Democrat Darrel Aubertine. In November 2010 she defeated Aubertine, this time for his seat in the State Senate. She was handily reelected in 2012, defeating a little known county legislator from Oswego County. She has run unopposed for reelection three times, in 2014, 2016 and 2018.

In 2011, Ritchie was named Chair of the Senate's Agriculture Committee, where she has been recognized as an outstanding champion of the state's 35,000 farm families and sponsored such initiatives as the Young Farmers Grant and loan forgiveness program. In 2016, Ritchie was named co-chair of the bi-cameral Legislative Commission on Rural Resources, and in 2017, was named Deputy Vice Chair of the important Health Committee, in recognition of her work to improve public health, especially in rural counties, like those she represents.

Personal life
She and her husband Tom live in Oswegatchie. They have three grown children.

References

External links
New York State Senate: Patty Ritchie

1962 births
Living people
Women state legislators in New York (state)
Republican Party New York (state) state senators
County clerks in New York (state)
State University of New York at Potsdam alumni
People from St. Lawrence County, New York
21st-century American politicians
21st-century American women politicians